Women of Paris (French: Femmes de Paris) is a 1953 French comedy drama film directed by Jean Boyer and starring Michel Simon, Brigitte Auber and Henri Génès.

Cast 
 Michel Simon as Professeur Charles Buisson
 Brigitte Auber as Gisèle
 Henri Génès as Lucien Mosca
 Germaine Kerjean as Mme. Rédéri
 Robert Lombard as Maurice
 Philippe Mareuil as Pierre-Dominique, dit 'Pépé'
 Georges Galley as Patrice
 Suzanne Norbert as Mme. Buisson
 Gaby Basset as Henriette
 Micheline Dax as La snob
 Anne Campion (fr) as La trafiquante
 Leila Lampi as Une danseuse
 Janine Clairville
 Nadine Tallier as Poupette
 Annick Tanguy
 Liane Morice
 Nikitine
 Liliane Montevecchi
 Jacky Lemoine
 Gisèle Fréry
 Nicole Rimbaud
 Janine Caire
 Bernard La Jarrige as Inspecteur Corbin
 Robert Lamoureux as himself
 Patachou as herself
 Ray Ventura as himself
 Jean-Marc Thibault
 Roger Pierre
 Les Quat'Jeudi
 Jacques Grello as (voice)
 Françoise Alban as Petit rôle
 Jack Ary as Le cow-boy
 Danièle Delorme as Elle-même
 Sophie Desmarets as Elle-même
 Sacha Distel as Un musicien
 Pierre Duncan as Un policier
 Bob Ingarao as Arsène l'édenté
 Dominique Marcas
 Michel Seldow
 Henri Serre as Un client du night club

References

Bibliography 
 Myriam Tsikounas. Imaginaires urbains du Paris romantique à nos jours. Editions Le Manuscrit, 2011.

External links 
 

1953 comedy-drama films
French comedy-drama films
1953 films
1950s French-language films
Films directed by Jean Boyer
Films set in Paris
French black-and-white films
1950s French films